Stanley Louis Dragland  (December 2, 1942 – August 2, 2022) was a Canadian novelist, poet and literary critic. A longtime professor of English literature at the University of Western Ontario, he was most noted for his 1994 critical study Floating Voice: Duncan Campbell Scott and the Literature of Treaty 9, which played a key role in the contemporary reevaluation of the legacy of poet Duncan Campbell Scott in light of his role as deputy superintendent of the Department of Indian Affairs.

Career
Born and raised in Calgary, Alberta, Dragland was educated at the University of Alberta and Queen's University. While teaching at Western, he was a founder of the poetry publisher Brick Books and the literary magazine Brick.

His first novel, Peckertracks, was a shortlisted finalist for the Books in Canada First Novel Award. He won the Newfoundland and Labrador Rogers Cable Non-Fiction Award in 2005 for his memoir Apocrypha: Further Journeys, and he was a shortlisted finalist for the E. J. Pratt Poetry Award in 2007 for Stormy Weather: Foursomes.

He wrote the forewords for the New Canadian Library editions of Scott's In the Village of Viger and Other Stories and Leonard Cohen's Beautiful Losers.

Personal life
During his academic career he was married to Marnie Parsons, a fellow professor at Western. The couple later separated. After his retirement, Dragland moved to St. John's, Newfoundland and Labrador, where he continued his writing career and remarried to Beth Follett, the publisher of Pedlar Press.

Dragland was made a member of the Order of Canada in 2021. Dragland died in Trinity, Newfoundland and Labrador during a hike on August 2, 2022, at the age of 79.

Books
Wilson MacDonald's Western Tour, 1923-4 (1975)
Peckertracks (1978)
Approaches to the Work of James Reaney (1983)
Simon Jesse's Journey (1983)
Journeys Through Bookland (1985)
The Bees of the Invisible (1991)
Floating Voice: Duncan Campbell Scott and the Literature of Treaty 9 (1994) 
New Life in Dark Seas (2000)
12 Bars (2002)
Apocrypha: Further Journeys (2003)
Stormy Weather: Foursomes (2005)
Hard-Headed and Big-Hearted: Writing Newfoundland (2006)
The Drowned Lands (2008)
Deep Too (2013)
The Bricoleur and His Sentences (2014)
Strangers & Others: Newfoundland Essays (2015)
Witness: Poetry and Prose of Joanne Page (2015)
Gerald Squires (2017)

References

1942 births
2022 deaths
20th-century Canadian novelists
20th-century Canadian poets
20th-century Canadian essayists
20th-century Canadian male writers
21st-century Canadian novelists
21st-century Canadian poets
21st-century Canadian essayists
21st-century Canadian male writers
Canadian male novelists
Canadian male poets
Canadian literary critics
Canadian magazine publishers (people)
Canadian book publishers (people)
University of Alberta alumni
Queen's University at Kingston alumni
Academic staff of the University of Western Ontario
Writers from Calgary
Writers from St. John's, Newfoundland and Labrador
Canadian male essayists
Members of the Order of Canada